Arasu may refer to:

 Arasu (2003 film), an Indian Tamil film
 Arasu (2007 film), an Indian Kannada film